The Judgment Day is a villainous professional wrestling stable on WWE's Raw brand, currently composed of Finn Bálor, Damian Priest, Rhea Ripley, and Dominik Mysterio. The stable was founded in 2022 by its previous leader Edge, who oversaw its darker supernatural gimmick. After Edge was kicked out following Bálor's addition to the group, The Judgment Day gradually lost its  supernatural elements and has since been portrayed as a sneering gang of goth bullies.

History 
The "Judgment Day" name was previously used by WWE for a series of PPV events between 1998 and 2009. First as part of the In Your House series then became its own event from 2000 after the cancellation of the former Over the Edge following the death of Owen Hart in 1999.

On the February 21, 2022, episode of Raw, Edge reflected on all the WrestleMania moments in his career and then he issued an open challenge for WrestleMania 38. The following week, his challenge was accepted by AJ Styles, to which Edge responded by performing a low blow on Styles before hitting him with a one-man con-chair-to, turning heel for the first time since 2010. At the event on April 3, Edge defeated Styles following a distraction by Damian Priest.

Following WrestleMania, Edge accepted Priest as his pupil and the team's name was revealed as The Judgment Day. On the April 18 episode of Raw, Edge challenged Styles to a rematch at WrestleMania Backlash, which Styles accepted. At the event on May 8, Edge defeated Styles after a masked individual, later revealed to be Rhea Ripley, shoved Styles off the turnbuckle. After the match, Ripley kneeled before Edge, becoming the stable's newest member. At Hell in a Cell on June 5, The Judgment Day defeated Styles, Finn Bálor, and Liv Morgan in a six-person mixed tag team match. The next night on Raw, Edge introduced Bálor as the newest member of The Judgment Day; however, Bálor, Priest, and Ripley suddenly attacked Edge and hit him with his own signature con-chair-to move, kicking him out of the stable, making Bálor the new leader.

The Judgment Day then began a feud with the Mysterios (Rey and Dominik) in an attempt to recruit Dominik into their ranks. At SummerSlam on July 30, Bálor and Priest were defeated by the Mysterios following interference from a returning Edge. At Clash at the Castle, Edge and Rey would defeat Bálor and Priest in a tag team match. After the match, Dominik attacked Edge and his own father, turning heel. Dominik officially joined the stable on the following episode of Raw, helping the group attack Edge and Rey. The following week, Dominik lost to Edge by disqualfication after Bálor, Priest, and Ripley attacked him. After the match, they attacked Edge's leg with a steel chair, ending the attack by placing the chair on Edge's leg and Bálor performing a Coup de Grace on the chair.

On the September 26 episode of Raw, Edge returned and challenged Bálor to an "I Quit" match at Extreme Rules and Bálor accepted. At the event on October 8, Bálor defeated Edge. After the match, Ripley attacked Edge’s wife, Beth Phoenix (who interfered in the match on Edge’s behalf) with a con-chair-to. Shortly afterwards, The Judgment Day resumed their feud with Styles, who brought back the returning Good Brothers (Luke Gallows and Karl Anderson) tag team, thus reforming The O.C. stable, after Styles rejected an offer to join by Balor, who was one of the leaders of the Bullet Club stable. This led to a match between the two stables at Crown Jewel. At the event on November 5, The Judgment Day defeated The O.C. following interference from Ripley. On the following episode of Raw, The O.C. introduced the returning Mia Yim as their solution to counter Ripley. On the November 14 episode of Raw, Bálor failed to win the United States Championship from Seth Rollins after The O.C. interfered. At Survivor Series WarGames on November 26, Bálor was defeated by Styles while Ripley's team was defeated by Yim's team in a WarGames match. On the following episode of Raw, The Judgment Day defeated The O.C. in an eight-person mixed tag team match to end their feud.

On the January 9, 2023 episode of Raw, Bálor, Priest, and Dominik won a tag team turmoil match against Gallows and Anderson, Cedric Alexander and Shelton Benjamin, Alpha Academy and The Street Profits for a Raw Tag Team Championship opportunity against The Usos at Raw Is XXX on January 23. Dominik and Priest failed to win the titles after Sami Zayn replaced an injured (kayfabe) Jimmy Uso. At the Royal Rumble on January 28, Dominik, Bálor, and Priest participated the men’s Royal Rumble match. Bálor and Priest were eliminated by Edge, while Dominik was eliminated by eventual winner, Cody Rhodes. Ripley also appeared at ringside to assist Bálor, Priest, and Dominik in their attack on Edge, only to be speared by Edge’s wife, Beth Phoenix. Later that night, Ripley won the women’s Royal Rumble match by last eliminating Liv Morgan. With this victory, Ripley became the fourth wrestler (after Shawn Michaels in 1995, Chris Benoit in 2004, and Edge in 2021) and the first female to win the Royal Rumble as the first entrant. On the following episode of Raw, Ripley declared that she will be challenging Charlotte Flair, who had previously won 2020 Women's Royal Rumble and subsequently challenged and defeated Ripley for the NXT Women's Championship at WrestleMania 36, for the SmackDown Women's Championship at WrestleMania 39. The following week, Edge and Phoenix challenged Bálor and Ripley to a mixed tag team match at Elimination Chamber. Later that night, Priest defeated Angelo Dawkins in an Elimination Chamber qualifying match. At the event on February 18, Bálor and Ripley were defeated by Edge and Phoenix despite interference from Dominik, while Priest failed to win the United States Championship inside the namesake structure. On the following episode of Raw, Bálor cost Edge his United States Championship match against Austin Theory. On the March 14 episode of Raw, Edge accepted Bálor’s challenge to a match at WrestleMania 39, which was stipulated as a Hell in a Cell match.

Reception 
The group is praised both backstage and by the fans, especially Dominik Mysterio and his heel turn.

According to Malakai Black, an AEW wrestler who previously competed in the WWE as Aleister Black, he compared The Judgment Day to House of Black, a stable he is a member of on his Twitch stream saying "I was well aware that WWE were going to basically mimic the House of Black. Y’know, what can I do? It is what it is. It only tells me that what we’re doing is clearly something that is very interesting and going very well."

Timeline 

Championships and accomplishments 
 Pro Wrestling Illustrated
Ranked Ripley No. 42 of the top 150 women's singles wrestlers in the PWI Women's 150 in 2022
Ranked Priest No. 57 of the top 500 singles wrestlers in the PWI 500 in 2022
Ranked Bálor No. 63 of the top 500 singles wrestlers in the PWI 500 in 2022
Ranked Mysterio No. 292 of the top 500 singles wrestlers in the PWI 500 in 2022
WWE
Women's Royal Rumble (2023) – Ripley

References

External links 
 
 
 
 
 
 Judgment Day Profile at Cagematch.net

Bullet Club members
WWE teams and stables